The year 2020 is the 17th year in the history of the Wu Lin Feng, a Chinese kickboxing promotion. The events are broadcast on Henan Television in mainland China and streamed on Douyin and Xigua Video.

List of events

Wu Lin Feng 2020: WLF World Cup 2019-2020 final

Wu Lin Feng 2020: WLF World Cup 2019-2020 Final was a kickboxing event held on January 11, 2020 in Zhuhai, China.

Results

Wu Lin Feng 2020: WLF World Championship in Baise

Wu Lin Feng 2020: WLF World Championship in Baise was a kickboxing event held on January 18.

Results

Wu Lin Feng 2020: King's Super Cup 1st Group Stage

Wu Lin Feng 2020: King's Super Cup 1st Group Stage was a kickboxing event held on May 15.

Results

Wu Lin Feng 2020: King's Super Cup 2nd Group Stage

Wu Lin Feng 2020: King's Super Cup 2nd Group Stage was a kickboxing event held on June 13.

Results

Wu Lin Feng 2020: King's Super Cup 3rd Group Stage

Wu Lin Feng 2020: King's Super Cup 3rd Group Stage was a kickboxing event held on July 05.

Results

Wu Lin Feng 2020: King's Super Cup 4th Group Stage

Wu Lin Feng 2020: King's Super Cup 4th Group Stage was a kickboxing event held on August 03.

Results

Wu Lin Feng 2020: China New Kings Tournament final

Wu Lin Feng 2020: China New Kings Tournament Final was a kickboxing event held on August 29.

Results

Wu Lin Feng 2020: King's Super Cup 5th Group Stage

Wu Lin Feng 2020: King's Super Cup 5th Group Stage was a kickboxing event held on September 23.

Results

Wu Lin Feng 2020: China New Kings Champions Challenge match

Wu Lin Feng 2020: China New Kings Champions Challenge match was a kickboxing event held on October 16.

Results

Wu Lin Feng 2020: King's Super Cup final

Wu Lin Feng 2020: King's Super Cup Final was a kickboxing event held on October 18.

Results

Wu Lin Feng 2020: China 60kg & 63kg Championship Tournament

Wu Lin Feng 2020: China 60kg & 63kg Championship Tournament was a kickboxing event held on November 14.

Results

Wu Lin Feng 2020: China 70kg Championship Tournament

Wu Lin Feng 2020: China 70kg Championship Tournament was a kickboxing event held on November 28.

Results

Wu Lin Feng 2020: Women's 52kg Championship Tournament

Wu Lin Feng 2020: Women's 52kg Championship Tournament was a kickboxing event held on December 22.

Results

See also
 2020 in Glory 
 2020 in K-1
 2020 in Kunlun Fight
 2020 in ONE Championship
 2020 in Romanian kickboxing

References

2020 in kickboxing
Kickboxing in China